Albert Harman Ellis was an American Democratic politician and farmer from Oklahoma. Ellis, born in Indiana on December 17, 1861, came to Oklahoma as a homesteader, participating in the Land Run of 1893 that opened the Cherokee Outlet for settlement. Ellis settled in present-day Garfield County southwest of Hayward.

Ellis was a member of the fourth Territorial Legislature of Oklahoma, the Oklahoma Constitutional Convention, and served as speaker pro tempore of the Oklahoma House of Representatives in the first Legislature of Oklahoma. He was defeated for reelection to the House by three votes. Ellis County, Oklahoma is named for him. Ellis died on June 18, 1950.

References

Constitution of Oklahoma
Ellis County, Oklahoma
1861 births
1950 deaths
People from Garfield County, Oklahoma
People from Indiana
20th-century Members of the Oklahoma House of Representatives
Members of the Oklahoma Territorial Legislature
Democratic Party members of the Oklahoma House of Representatives